Rita Cetina Gutiérrez (22 May 1846 – 11 October 1908) was a Mexican teacher, poet and feminist who promoted secular education in the nineteenth century in Mérida, Yucatán. She was one of the first feminists and influenced the generation of young women who fueled the first wave of feminism in Mexico.

Biography
Rita Cetina Gutiérrez was born 22 May 1846 in Mérida, Yucatán, Mexico to Colonel Don Pedro Cetina and Jacoba Gutiérrez. Cetina's father was murdered when she was 14 and a benefactor assisted her in attaining her education. She studied under two noted scholars from Cuba, Domingo Laureano Paz and Félix Ramos y Duarte, who were living in Mérida.

She wrote poetry from about 1860 which was published in many local journals and newspapers, sometimes using the pen name Cristabela. Typical themes were love, a desire for justice, education and patriotism.

With the support of Gertrudis Tenorio Zavala and Cristina Farfán, on 3 May 1870 Cetina opened La Siempreviva (Everlasting), an institution consisting of Mexico's first secular school for poor girls as well as an art college for young women. She established simultaneously a scientific and literary society and a newspaper of the same name, specifically written for ladies and young women. Teaching at the girls school covered reading, grammar and geography, as in other girls schools of the period, but surprisingly it also included religious history, reflecting Cetina's own faith. The curriculum of the art college included literature, drawing, reciting, music (piano) and theater. In addition to publishing her own paper, Cetina was listed as an editor of the newspaper El Federalista (The Federalist). She rejected the idea that women's studies should include only domestic skills and offered a curriculum including astronomy, constitutional law, geometry, geography, history, and mathematics. As well as discussions on children, "the double standard", female sexuality, love, and marriage.

Seven years after founding her school, the Instituto Literario de Niñas (ILN) (Literary Institute for Girls) was created by Governor Manuel Cepeda Peraza and Cetina was asked to become its director. She agreed because the school offered women the opportunity to have both secondary education and teacher's training in a normal school. La Siempreviva remained open operating as a private school until it merged with the ILN in 1886.

Cetina's lasting legacy and contributions to the feminist movement of Yucatán at the turn of the twentieth century, is clearly seen in some of the pupils she taught: Susana Betancourt Yucatecan representatives at the Pan-American Conference of Women in Baltimore in 1922; Elvia Carrillo Puerto elected as a Yucatán State Deputy in 1923; Raquel Dzib Cicero elected as a Yucatán State Deputy in 1923; Leonarda Gómez Blanco who served as Director of Education in both Campeche and Tlaxcala Beatríz Peniche Barrera elected as a Yucatán State Deputy in 1923; Gloria Mireya Rosado Yucatecan representatives at the Pan American Feminist Congress in Baltimore in 1922; Elena Torres founder of the first Montessori School in Mexico; Rosa Torre González first woman elected to any office in Mexico elected to the Mérida City Council in 1922; and Consuelo Zavala head of the organizing committee of the First Feminist Congress.

Cetina retired in 1902 and died in Mérida on 11 October 1908.

Selected works

"A México" (1867)
"A Nuestro Sexo" (1870)
"Al Partir"
"Babilonia"
"Deudas de corazón"
"Oda a los héroes de Tihosuco"
"Recuerdo, A una flor" 

Source

References

1846 births
1908 deaths
Mexican educators
Mexican feminists
Mexican feminist writers
Writers from Yucatán (state)
People from Mérida, Yucatán
Mexican women's rights activists
Mexican women poets
19th-century Mexican poets
19th-century Mexican people
19th-century Mexican women writers